Three-quarter view may refer to:

 The three-quarter profile (or two-third) in portraits
 The three-quarter perspective (2.5D) in video games